Suburbicon is a 2017 American black comedy crime film directed by George Clooney and co-written by the Coen brothers, Clooney, and Grant Heslov. It stars Matt Damon, Julianne Moore, Noah Jupe, and Oscar Isaac, and follows a mild-mannered father in 1959 who must face his demons after a home invasion, all while a black family moves into the all-white neighborhood. The black family storyline is loosely based on a 1957 incident in Levittown, Pennsylvania, in which a black family moved into the previously all-white neighborhood, leading to racism and violence against the family.

Principal photography for the film began in October 2016 in Los Angeles. It premiered in the main competition section of the 74th Venice International Film Festival on September 2, 2017, and then was screened at the 2017 Toronto International Film Festival before being theatrically released in the United States on October 27, 2017. The film received negative reviews from critics and was a box-office bomb, earning $12 million against its $25 million budget.

Plot
In the late spring of 1959, the peaceful, all-white neighborhood of Suburbicon is shaken by the arrival of the African-American Mayers family.

Gardner Lodge, a seemingly mild-mannered family man, lives in Suburbicon with his paraplegic wife, Rose, and their son, Nicky. One night when Rose's identical twin sister, Margaret, is staying over, two robbers, Sloan and Louis, break into his house, tie the whole family up, and knock them out with chloroform. Rose receives an overdose and never regains consciousness. After the funeral, Margaret moves in to help take care of Nicky and soon begins to transform herself into Rose, dyeing her hair blonde and having sex with Gardner.

The Lodges are called to the police station to identify Sloan and Louis, but both Gardner and Margaret say the police have the wrong men, even though Nicky recognizes them as his mother's murderers. Soon after this, Sloan and Louis show up at Gardner's job and demand the money he owes them as payment for killing Rose. When Gardner refuses to pay, they make plans to kill Nicky and Margaret.

With tensions mounting between the residents of Suburbicon and their new African-American neighbors the Mayers, charismatic insurance agent Bud Cooper arrives on the Lodge's doorstep one day when Gardner is not home and begins to question Margaret. He initially says he is simply looking to clear up red flags in a life insurance claim Gardner made on Rose, but eventually admits to Margaret that he suspects her and Gardner of murdering Rose to collect on the policy, at which point Margaret kicks him out of the house.

That night, as the protracted protest at the Mayers' home turns into a riot, Cooper returns to talk with Gardner. He tells Gardner that he knows the nature of his and Margaret's insurance-fraud plan and attempts to blackmail them into giving him their entire payout in exchange for his silence. Margaret poisons his coffee with lye, and Gardner bashes his head in with a fireplace poker to finish him off. Gardner leaves to hide the body, trailed by Sloan.

Margaret attempts to kill Nicky with a poisoned sandwich and milk after she catches him calling his Uncle Mitch for help, but he refuses to leave his room. Louis enters and strangles Margaret to death. He heads upstairs to murder Nicky, but Mitch arrives just in time and shoots Louis dead. Mitch gives Nicky his gun and hides the boy in a closet before succumbing to a stab wound inflicted by Louis.

On the way home from disposing of Cooper's body, Gardner is taunted by Sloan, who is suddenly hit and killed by a fire truck that was speeding to a fire started by the rioters at the Mayers' home. At his own house, he discovers the bodies of Margaret, Mitch, and Louis, and finds Nicky in the closet. Gardner offers Nicky a choice: to go along with his plan to take the insurance money and run away to Aruba, or die, with Gardner claiming his son was yet another of Louis' victims.

The next morning, Gardner is dead, having consumed the poisoned sandwich and milk during his conversation with Nicky. Nicky calmly goes outside to play ball with Andy, the young son of the Mayer whom he has befriended, while his parents and a few members of the community clean up the mess left in the wake of the riot.

Cast

 Matt Damon as Gardner Lodge
 Julianne Moore as Rose (Gardner's wife) and Margaret, identical twin sisters
 Noah Jupe as Nicky Lodge, Gardner and Rose's son
 Glenn Fleshler as Ira Sloan, a hitman
 Alex Hassell as Louis, Sloan's partner
 Gary Basaraba as Uncle Mitch, Rose and Margaret's brother
 Oscar Isaac as Bud Cooper, an insurance claims investigator
 Jack Conley as Hightower, a police officer investigating Rose's death
 Karimah Westbrook as Mrs. Mayers, member of the African-American family that moves to Suburbicon
 Tony Espinosa as Andy Mayers, member of the African-American family that moves to Suburbicon
 Leith Burke as Mr. Mayers, member of the African-American family that moves to Suburbicon
 Michael D. Cohen as Stretch, an angry resident of Suburbicon
 Megan Ferguson as June, a resident of Suburbicon
 Richard Kind as John Sears (voice)

Development
According to executive producer Joel Silver, Joel and Ethan Coen originally wrote the script for Suburbicon in 1986, soon after the release of their film Blood Simple. In 2005, it was reported that George Clooney would star in and direct Suburbicon, while the Coen brothers would produce.

The film was eventually made ten years later, combining two previously unrelated scripts, one the crime film by the Coens, and the other a historical drama by Clooney and Grant Heslov based on the real-life story of the Myers family, the only black family in all-white Levittown, Pennsylvania, who faced racially-charged harassment and violence from other residents. On December 8, 2015, Matt Damon, Julianne Moore, and Josh Brolin joined the cast; Oscar Isaac and Woody Harrelson later signed on, as well. On August 31, 2016, Noah Jupe and Glenn Fleshler joined, to play Damon's character's son and a hitman, respectively.

On September 27, 2016, Harrelson said in an interview that he would not be in the film due to scheduling conflicts. In August 2017, it was reported that Brolin had been cut from the final edit of the film.

Alexandre Desplat composed the film's score.

Release
Paramount Pictures released the film in the United States on October 27, 2017.

Home media
Suburbicon was released on Digital HD on January 23, 2018, and on Blu-ray and DVD on February 6.

Reception

Box office
Suburbicon grossed $5.8 million in the United States and Canada, and $4.5 million in other territories, for a worldwide total of $10.2 million, against a production budget of $25 million.

In the United States and Canada, Suburbicon was released alongside Thank You for Your Service and Jigsaw, and was projected to gross around $8 million from 2,046 theaters in its opening weekend. However, after making $1.1 million on its first day, weekend estimates were lowered to $3 million. It ended up debuting to $2.8 million, finishing 9th at the box office. The weekend marked the lowest wide opening for any of Clooney's directorial efforts, and of Matt Damon's career, and the 32nd worst-ever opening for a film playing in over 2,000 theaters. Box-office receipts for the film dropped 59% (to $1.2 million) in its second weekend, when it finished 13th at the box office.

Critical response
On review-aggregator website Rotten Tomatoes, the film has an approval rating of 28% based on 250 reviews, with an average rating of 4.94/10; the site's critical consensus reads: "A disappointing misfire for director George Clooney, Suburbicon attempts to juggle social satire, racial commentary, and murder mystery — and ends up making a mess of all three." On Metacritic, which assigns a normalized rating to reviews, the film has a weighted average score of 42 out of 100, based on 49 critics, indicating "mixed or average reviews". Audiences polled by CinemaScore gave the film an average grade of "D−" on an A+ to F scale.

David Rooney of The Hollywood Reporter wrote: "Suburbicon is just too obvious in its satirical depiction of the dubious morality and social inequality behind the squeaky-clean façade of postwar American life, though it's watchable enough, and a distinct improvement for Clooney on his last directorial outing."

Accolades

See also
 United States in the 1950s
 Social thriller

References

External links

 
 
 
 
 

2017 films
2017 black comedy films
2017 comedy films
2010s crime thriller films
American crime comedy films
American black comedy films
American comedy thriller films
Black Bear Pictures films
Dark Castle Entertainment films
Adultery in films
Films about racism
Films directed by George Clooney
Films produced by George Clooney
Films produced by Grant Heslov
Films produced by Joel Silver
Films scored by Alexandre Desplat
Films set in 1959
Films shot in Los Angeles
Films with screenplays by George Clooney
Films with screenplays by the Coen brothers
Films with screenplays by Grant Heslov
Paramount Pictures films
Silver Pictures films
Smokehouse Pictures films
Sororicide in fiction
Uxoricide in fiction
Incest in film
2010s English-language films
2010s American films